RMS Medina was an ocean liner built by Caird and Company, Greenock, Scotland, in 1911, for the Peninsular and Oriental Steam Navigation Company. She was a Royal Mail Ship intended for use on the London to Australia route and was the last of the ten ships in P&O's M-Class. Between November 1911 and February 1912 Medina took King George V and Queen Mary to India for the Delhi Durbar. Medina was lost when she was torpedoed on 28 April 1917.

Design and construction
RMS Medina was the last of ten ships ordered by the Peninsular and Oriental Steam Navigation Company of the ‘M’ class. The order was placed with Caird and Company of Greenock, Scotland. She was 550 feet long and 62 feet wide with a depth of 34 feet. She was to carry 670 passengers, 450 in first class and 220 in second.

During building it was decided that Medina would take King George V and Queen Mary to India for the Delhi Durbar. Medina was, therefore, initially commissioned into the Royal Navy as the Royal Yacht and her crew were mainly naval personnel. Medina was provided with an extra mast, necessary to maintain Royal flag etiquette and furnished with a white hull with bands of royal blue and gold and buff funnels. Various large rooms intended for public use were redecorated as Royal apartments.

Maiden voyage

She was then delivered to P&O in June 1912. She had only two years of peacetime service before the First World War broke out, but remained with P&O during the war.

Torpedoed
 torpedoed her off Start Point, Devon on 28 April 1917.

Today Medinas wreck is upright with a 15 degree list to port. She is reasonably intact despite salvage of copper and passengers' baggage from forward holds. Her stern is most damaged and she is sinking into the mud of the seabed. Her bulkheads are collapsing and her compartments are folding down.

Citations and references
Citations

references

External links
 

 

1911 ships
Ships built on the River Clyde
Maritime incidents in 1917
Ships of P&O (company)
Royal and presidential yachts
Ships sunk by German submarines in World War I
World War I shipwrecks in the English Channel
Steam yachts